The Grêmio Recreativo Escola de Samba Portela from Rio de Janeiro, Brazil is a traditional samba school. Founded in 1923, it has the highest number of wins in the top-tier Rio parade, with 22 titles in total, including the 2017 Carnival parade.

History 
At the start of the 20th century, in Oswaldo Cruz, a neighborhood in the city of Rio de Janeiro forms a carnivalesque group of dancers called Quem Fala de Nós Come Mosca which literally translated as "Who talks about us eats flies". They are based in Dona Ester. A dissidence of this group of dancers (called "bloco" in Brazilian Portuguese) appears in 1922 and another bloco, the Baianinhas de Oswaldo Cruz (Baianas of Oswaldo Cruz) is created. Later, a dissidence of Baianas creates the Conjunto Carnavalesco Oswaldo Cruz (Carnaval Ensemble Oswaldo Cruz) on April 11, 1926. The founders are from Oswaldo Cruz however, Grêmio Recreativo Escola de Samba Portela is actually founded, on 412 Portela Road, in the neighborhood of Madureira.

After winning the contest between sambistas in 1929, performed in the house of Zé Espinguela, the bloco changes its name to Quem nos Faz é o Capricho (Who makes us is caprice). In 1931, when the samba schools are still being determined, the group changes its name again, this time to Vai como Pode (Go as you can). In 1935, the school is the champion of the first official parade of the city of Rio de Janeiro.

The name "Vai como Pode" is used until 1935, when, after the Carnaval, on March 1 of 1935, on the occasion of the renovation of the licence of the school in the police, the officer Dulcídio Gonçalves refused to renovate the license with this name, considering it as vulgar and not dignified for a samba school. The same officer suggested a new name, Grêmio Recreativo e Escola de Samba Portela, in homage to the street in Madureira where sambistas had gathered. The change pleased the community; many had already been referring to the school as the "folks from Portela". In 1939, the samba of Paulo da Portela, "Teste ao Samba" (Test for the samba), was considered the first samba-enredo. In the same year, Portela renovated things by bringing to the parade costumes totally framed to the enredo (plot).

In 1941, after a misunderstanding with the master of ceremonies Manuel Bambã, Paulo da Portela, the group, stopped parading. This occurred because Paulo, during a long period of time, argued that all of the components would parade correctly costumed, dressed with the colors of the school, however on the day of the parade he came back from a presentation in São Paulo, along with Heitor dos Prazeres and Cartola, and all of them were dressed in black and white. With no time to change costumes, they agreed to parade without changing clothes, together, in the samba schools of each one. However, in the turn to parade for Portela, Bambã did not authorize that the other two (Heitor and Cartola), not being from the school and not being correctly dressed, would parade. Actually Bambã had already had misunderstandings with Heitor, that once belonged to Portela. However, at that time, many portelenses (people who liked Portela) favoured Bambã, because they judged lack of coherency on the part of Paulo da Portela, that argued so much that they should parade with the colours of the school and then parade with black and white. After this, Paulo da Portela never paraded for his school.

In total, Portela conquered 22 titles of Carnaval, being the school with the largest number of titles to date.
Some of the great Brazilian samba composers, such as Monarco, Zé Keti, Casquinha, Manacéa, Candeia, Aldir Blanc, Paulinho da Viola, João Nogueira, Noca da Portela, Colombo, among others, beyond being one of the most traditional samba schools of Brazil, worked for the school. Portela has an important participation in the cultural life of the city during the entire year, through the presentations of her Velha Guarda (Brazilian term for the oldest-ones (among a group of people)) and of her prizewinning bateria, among other things. The school's symbol is an eagle that in all the parades is seen in the abre alas (Brazilian term for car that opens the samba parade in Carnival) of the school. The Velha Guarda also released an album called Tudo Azul in 1999.

The bateria – called Tabajara do Samba (Tabajara of Samba) – is characterized mainly by the touch of the Surdo de Terceira invented by Sula in the 1940s, and the touch of the boxes with a peculiar frill. It is the most heavy bateria of the Carioca Carnival and counts on a big number of surdos (a type of drum) of First, Second, and Third. They were masters of GRES Portela: Master Betinho of the foundation in the 1960s, Master Cinco in the 1970s, Master Marçal in the 1980s, Mater Timbó in the 1990s, among others.

More than three decades later, Portela does not know how to win the carnival alone. From 1990, the school suffered many internal problems, that reflected on the parades and on the collocations of the parades. The best moment was in 1995 when the plot "Gosto que me enrosco" (I like when I twist myself) gave the vice-championship to the school of Madureira. In 2005, Portela stayed in 13th place, in the polemic parade where the school was prohibited to use their Velha Guarda. In 2006, the school recovered and stayed in 7th place, and in 2007 with the plot about the 2007 Pan American Games (held in Rio de Janeiro) fell one step, staying in 8th place.

An opposition movement formed that promoted carreatas and various events through the neighborhood of Madureira, and culminated in the election of May 19, 2013, where the plate "Portela Verdade", formed by Serginho Procópio, composer and member of the old-guard, the police Marcos Falcon besides Monarco as president of honor of the plate, was approved by winning, beat then President Nilo Figueiredo, who announced the result that ended with 154 votes for Serginho, 151 Nile and 8 null votes.

In 2014, the team was presented: the carnival producer Alexandre Louzada, carnival director Luiz Carlos Bruno, the singer Wantuir in master-room Diogo Jesus and the porta bandeira Danielle Birth the Ghislaine Cavalcanti, choreographer of the front. The plot of 2014 "Um Rio, de Mar a Mar. Do Valongo à Glória de São Sebastião" addressed how the carioca has adapted over the course of the transformations in the region between the waterfront and the Bairro da Glória (neighborhood in Rio de Janeiro), the blue and white made best parade in recent years, being considered one of the favorites. However they got the third place with 299 to 4 tenths of a champion. The result was celebrated by the board and twisted.

Already the plot was set for 2015, which was on the 450th anniversary of Rio de Janeiro. With the continuity of the carnival producer Alexandre Louzada and there is the acquisition of Wander Pires, who stood at the end of the theme song, being promoted to singer beside Wantuir, being one of its highlights the redemptive Eagle however with many ups and downs, the school managed the 5th placing. In 2016, the school brought the notorious Paulo Barros changing the direction of harmony.

After the 2016 carnival Marcos Falcon won the vote of the school and became president of the school after serving as vice-president. But months after taking office, he resigned to run in the city council elections. As a result, the 2017 general championship, the first in 33 years, was the first school victory under historian Luis Carlos Magalhãe, who assumed the presidency in the spring of 2016.

Classifications

Championships and awards 

Portela is the record samba school of Carnaval titles of Rio de Janeiro, being general champion for 22 times: 1935, 1939, 1941, 1942, 1943, 1944, 1945, 1946, 1947, 1951 (UGESB), 1953, 1957, 1958, 1959, 1960, 1962, 1964, 1966, 1970, 1980, 1984 and 2017. The school got runner up honors in the following years: 1937, 1949, 1950, 1956, 1971, 1974, 1977, 1982, 1983, and 1995.

The school accumulates a total of 52 Estandarte de Ouro (Gold Standards), prize conceded by the newspaper O Globo:

1972: Drum Block
1973: Feminine notability (Tia Vicentina)
1974: Ala (of baianas) and master of ceremonies (Bagdá)
1975: Samba-enredo
1976: School
1977: Standard-bearer (Vilma Nascimento) and feminine dancer (Nega Pelé)
1978: Standard-bearer (Vilma Nascimento) and masculine dancer (Jerônimo)
1979: School, samba-enredo, ala (velha-guarda), standard-bearer (Vilma Nascimento), feminine dancer (Denise) and masculine dancer (Marcelo)
1980: School, audience impact and feminine dancer (Nívea)
1981: Best Front commission and samba-enredo
1982: Best Front commission
1983: Leading singer of the samba parade (Silvinho)
1986: Best Drum Block, feminine notability (Dodô) and ala (Luxo do Lixo)
1987: Samba-enredo
1988: Masculine dancer(Gilson)
1990: Feminine dancer (Solange Couto)
1991: Samba-enredo, front commission, revelation (Patrícia) and ala (of queens)
1995: School, samba-enredo and leading singer of the parade (Rixxa)
1998: Samba-enredo and masculine dancer (Cláudio Lima)
2001: Commission of front
2004: Personality (Dodô)
2005: Revelation (Bruno Ribas)
2006: Revelation (Nilo Sérgio)
2007: Revelation (Alessandra Bessa) and masculine dancer (Ruanderson)
2008: Female dancer 
2010: Drum Block
2012: Drum Block, leading singer of the parade, samba-enredo and best dancers (male and female)
2013: Drum Block
2014: Ala (Senior Women's')
2015: Revelation (Alex Marcelino)
2016: Personality (Monarco)

Notable Portelenses 

 Aldir Blanc
 Alexandre Louzada
 Agepê
 Ana Paula Araújo
 Argemiro Patrocínio
 Candeia
 Carla Vilhena
 Carlinhos Brown
 Carlos Roberto
 Casquinha
 Clara Nunes
 Clementina de Jesus
 Dejan Petković
 Diogo Nogueira
 Dodô da Portela
 Eduardo Paes
 Gilberto Gil
 Glória Pires
 Heitor dos Prazeres
 Hilário Jovino Ferreira
 Jair do Cavaco
 João Nogueira
 Juliana Diniz
 Luiz Ayrão
 Luma de Oliveira
 Manacéa
 Maria Rita 
 Marisa Monte
 Mauro Diniz
 Monarco
 Noca da Portela
 Paulinho da Costa
 Paulinho da Viola
 Paulo César Pinheiro
 Sheron Menezes
 Teresa Cristina
 Tia Doca
 Tia Surica
 Wilson Moreira
 Zeca Pagodinho
 Zé Keti

References

External links 
  Torcida Organizada Guerreiros da Águia

Samba schools of Rio de Janeiro